Bring It Back Alive is a live album by American southern rock band Outlaws, released in 1978. It was released as a double album, and later re-released as a single CD. The album is best known for the twenty minute-long rendition of the song "Green Grass and High Tides" from the band's debut album.

Due to a printing mistake, early copies of the 8-track & cassette versions had the title Bring 'Em Back Alive. Although the cover of the vinyl version used the album's proper title (Bring It Back Alive), the labels on all four sides read Bring 'Em Back Alive as well.

Track listing
"Intro [Relay Breakdown]" – 1:06
"Stick Around for Rock & Roll" (Thomasson) – 9:10
"Lover Boy" (Thomasson) – 4:11
"There Goes Another Love Song" (Thomasson, Yoho) – 4:19
"Freeborn Man" (Allison, Lindsay) – 5:48
"Prisoner" (Jones) – 7:17
"I Hope You Don't Mind" (Salem) – 5:31
"Song for You" (Jones, Thomasson) – 4:01
"Cold and Lonesome" (Arnold) – 3:43
"Holiday" (Jones) – 4:49
"Hurry Sundown" (Thomasson) – 4:15
"Green Grass and High Tides" (Thomasson) – 20:41

Personnel
Harvey Dalton Arnold - bass, guitar, vocals
David Dix - percussion, drums
Billy Jones - guitar, vocals
Freddie Salem - guitar, vocals
Hughie Thomasson - guitar, vocals
Monte Yoho - percussion, drums

Production
Producers: Allan Blazek, Bill Szymczyk
Executive producer: Bill Szymczyk
Engineers: Ross Alexander, Alex Clark, Joseph Foglia, Kelly Kotera, Rick Sanchez, Peter Yanos
Assistant engineer: Eric Schilling
Mixing: Allan Blazek
Digital remastering: Bill Inglot, Ken Perry
Art direction: Ron Kellum
Design: Ron Kellum
Special effects photography: John Barrett

Charts
Album

Singles

References

Outlaws (band) albums
Albums produced by Bill Szymczyk
1978 live albums
Arista Records live albums